Belondiridae is a family of nematodes belonging to the order Dorylaimida.

Genera

Genera:
 Amphibelondira Rahman, Jairajpuri, Ahmad & Ahmad, 1987
 Anchobelondira Nair & Coomans, 1971
 Axonchium Cobb, 1920

References

Nematodes